The following is a list of Registered Historic Places in Bay County, Michigan.



|}

Former listings

|}

See also

 List of Michigan State Historic Sites in Bay County, Michigan
 National Register of Historic Places listings in Michigan
 Listings in neighboring counties: Arenac, Midland, Saginaw, Tuscola

References

Bay County
Bay County, Michigan
Buildings and structures in Bay County, Michigan